The Protoxerini comprise a tribe of squirrels found in Africa. The 30 species in six genera are:

Epixerus (monotypic) - Ebian's palm squirrel
Funisciurus (nine species) - African striped squirrels
Heliosciurus (six species) - sun squirrels
Myosciurus (monotypic) - African pygmy squirrel
Paraxerus (11 species) - African bush squirrels
Protoxerus (two species) - African giant squirrels

References

Protoxerini
Mammal tribes